Horacio Martín Ramírez Esquivel (born March 21, 1984 in Posadas, Argentina) is an Argentine goalkeeper who plays for Brown de Adrogué. 

He previously played in the Argentine Primera División with Club Atlético Lanús, Crucero del Norte and Quilmes Atlético Club.

Club career
Ramírez played youth football with Luz y Fuerza before his former coach, Rubén Kleyser, signed him to a professional contract with Primera División club Lanús.

After failing to feature regularly for Lanús, Ramírez joined Club Social y Deportivo Flandria where he made 40 appearances in the 2007–08 Primera B Metropolitana season.

Ramírez had a one-year stint with Peruvian side Bolognesi before signing to Barracas Central for the 2010-11 Primera B Metropolitana season. He led Club Atlético Colegiales to a runner's up finish in the 2011–12 Primera Metropolitana season.

References

External links
 

1984 births
Living people
Argentine footballers
Argentine expatriate footballers
Sportspeople from Misiones Province
Club Atlético Lanús footballers
Flandria footballers
Club Atlético Colegiales (Argentina) players
CSyD Tristán Suárez footballers
Crucero del Norte footballers
Gimnasia y Esgrima de Jujuy footballers
Club Almagro players
Coronel Bolognesi footballers
Unión Magdalena footballers
Club Atlético Brown footballers
Argentine Primera División players
Peruvian Primera División players
Primera Nacional players
Primera B Metropolitana players
Categoría Primera A players
People from Posadas, Misiones
Association football goalkeepers
Argentine expatriate sportspeople in Peru
Argentine expatriate sportspeople in Colombia
Expatriate footballers in Peru
Expatriate footballers in Colombia